Sazanami (漣, "Ripples") was an Ikazuchi-class destroyer of the  Imperial Japanese Navy. It was one of the smallest and oldest destroyers of the Japanese navy. Only being 220 feet long, which made 30 to 32 knots and capable of 6000 horsepower.

Service history
Completed on 28 August 1899, she arrived at Sasebo on March 24, 1900, where she was classified as a destroyer.

During the Russo-Japanese War, Sazanami participated in the battles of Port Arthur and Yalu River. At the Battle of Tsushima, The Russian destroyer Bedovii, which was carrying the wounded Zinovy Rozhestvensky, surrendered to her.

On 1 April 1913, the destroyer was decommissioned. On 23 August 1914 , it was transferred as a miscellaneous service ship, designated as a target ship, and renamed Sazanami Maru. On 29 August 1916, she was sunk off the coast of Tateyama as a target. She was later sold for scrap on 9 January 1917.

References 

1899 establishments
Imperial Japanese Navy
Ikazuchi-class destroyers
1899 ships